Acidobacteriota is a phylum of Gram-negative bacteria. Its members are physiologically diverse and ubiquitous, especially in soils, but are under-represented in culture.

Description
Members of this phylum are physiologically diverse, and can be found in a variety of environments including soil, decomposing wood, hot springs, oceans, caves, and metal-contaminated soils. The members of this phylum are particularly abundant in soil habitats representing up to 52% of the total bacterial community. Environmental factors such as pH and nutrients have been seen to drive Acidobacteriota dynamics. Many Acidobacteriota are acidophilic, including the first described member of the phylum, Acidobacterium capsulatum.

Other notable species are Holophaga foetida, Geothrix fermentans, Acanthopleuribacter pedis and Bryobacter aggregatus.
Since they have only recently been discovered and the large majority have not been cultured, the ecology and metabolism of these bacteria is not well understood. However, these bacteria may be an important contributor to ecosystems, since they are particularly abundant within soils. Members of subdivisions 1, 4, and 6 are found to be particularly abundant in soils.

As well as their natural soil habitat, unclassified subdivision 2 Acidobacteriota have also been identified as a contaminant of DNA extraction kit reagents, which may lead to their erroneous appearance in microbiota or metagenomic datasets.

Members of subdivision 1 have been found to dominate in low pH conditions. Additionally, Acidobacteriota from acid mine drainage have been found to be more adapted to acidic pH conditions (pH 2-3) compared to Acidobacteriota from soils, potentially due to cell specialization and enzyme stability.

The G+C content of Acidobacteria genomes are consistent within their subdivisions - above 60% for group V fragments and roughly 10% lower for group III fragments.

The majority of Acidobacteriota are considered aerobes. There are some Acidobacteriota that are considered anaerobes within subdivision 8 and subdivision 23. It has been found that some strains of Acidobacteriota originating from soils have the genomic potential to respire oxygen at atmospheric and sub-atmospheric concentrations.

Members of the Acidobacteriota phylum have been considered oligotrophic bacteria due to high abundances in low organic carbon environments. However, the variation in this phylum may indicate that they may not have the same ecological strategy.

History
The first species, Acidobacterium capsulatum, of this phylum was discovered in 1991. However, Acidobacteriota were not recognized as a distinct clade until 1997, and were not recognized as a phylum until 2012. First genome was sequenced in 2006.

Metabolism

Carbon 
Some members of subdivision 1 are able to use D-glucose, D-xylose, and lactose as carbon sources, but are unable to use fucose or sorbose. Members of subdivision 1 also contain enzymes such as galactosidases used in the breakdown of sugars. Members of subdivision 4 have been found to use chitin as a carbon source.

Nitrogen 
There has been no clear evidence that Acidobacteriota are involved in nitrogen-cycle processes such as nitrification, denitrification, or nitrogen fixation. However, Geothrix fermantans was shown to be able to reduce nitrate and contained the norB gene. The NorB gene was also identified in Koribacter verstailis and Solibacter usitatus. In addition, the presence of the nirA gene has been observed in members of subdivision 1. Additionally, to date, all genomes have been described to directly uptake ammonium via ammonium channel transporter family genes. Acidobacteriota can use both inorganic and organic nitrogen as their nitrogen sources.

Phylogeny
The currently accepted taxonomy is based on the List of Prokaryotic names with Standing in Nomenclature and National Center for Biotechnology Information.

See also
 List of bacterial orders
 List of bacteria genera

References

External links
 Acidobacteria bacterium Ellin345 Genome Page
 Acidobacterium Genome Projects (from Genomes OnLine Database)
 Science Daily article
 Scientific American article
 acidoseq, A Python package for studying Acidobacteria

 
Acidophiles